Joris Colinet (born 27 September 1982) is a French former professional footballer who played as a striker.

Career
Colinet played on the professional level in Ligue 2 for Rouen.

Honours 
Quevilly

 Coupe de France runner-up: 2011–12

Notes

References

1982 births
Living people
French footballers
Ligue 2 players
FC Rouen players
People from Mont-Saint-Aignan
US Quevilly-Rouen Métropole players
US Orléans players
Championnat National players
Association football forwards
Sportspeople from Seine-Maritime
Footballers from Normandy